"Young" is a single by South Korean singer Baekhyun and rapper Loco. The song was released on August 31, 2018 by SM Entertainment through STATION X 0.

Background and release 
On July 23, it was revealed that Baekhyun will collaborate with Loco. On August 21, it was confirmed that the single is titled "Young" and will be released on August 31 through SM Station X 0.

"Young" was described as an electro pop track with a heavy beat and an addictive melody. The lyrics are about the strong aspirations of a younger generation who refuses to live the exact same way as others.

Critical reception 
"Young" received generally favorable reviews from music critics. Tamar Herman from Billboard wrote that the "song revels in the vocalist’s expressive tone and Loco’s rhythmic style as it critiques societal norms, such as education, that make "Young" people turn away from their own distinct paths". Taylor Amani from MACG Magazine states that the "music video and lyrics mirror the irregular composition. Wanting to be unique and fighting rigid standards holds true throughout".

Commercial performance 
Upon release, "Young" quickly reached the top spots on South Korean music charts including Melon, Genie, Bugs, Soribada, and Olleh Music. The song debuted as number eleven on Korea's Gaon Digital Chart, and number four on Billboard's US World Digital Songs.

Charts

Weekly

Monthly

Awards and nominations

Release history

References 

Baekhyun songs
2018 songs
2018 singles
Korean-language songs
SM Entertainment singles
Song articles with missing songwriters